Reneta Bancheva (born 19 September 1968) is a Bulgarian cross-country skier. She competed in four events at the 1992 Winter Olympics.

References

External links
 

1968 births
Living people
Bulgarian female cross-country skiers
Olympic cross-country skiers of Bulgaria
Cross-country skiers at the 1992 Winter Olympics
Place of birth missing (living people)